Gösta Backlund (10 July 1893 – 26 November 1918) was a Swedish footballer. He made two appearances for Sweden and won one Svenska Mästerskapet with Djurgårdens IF.

Honours

Club 

 Djurgårdens IF 
 Svenska Mästerskapet: 1912

References

Swedish footballers
Djurgårdens IF Fotboll players
1893 births
1918 deaths
Association football fullbacks
Sweden international footballers